"Newgrange" is a song by the Irish group Clannad, released in 1983 on the album Magical Ring, and as a single. The song was used in the film Intermission, and was covered by Órla Fallon from Celtic Woman on the album Celtic Woman: A New Journey.

Track listing
 "Newgrange"
 "Seachrán Charn tSiail"

See also
Newgrange

1983 singles
Clannad songs
Songs written by Ciarán Brennan
1983 songs
RCA Records singles